Kirk D. Stensrud (born March 1962) is a Minnesota politician and former member of the Minnesota House of Representatives who represented District 48A, which included portions of western Hennepin County in the Twin Cities metropolitan area. A Republican, he is the owner of Fish Window Cleaning in Edina, and a former medical salesperson.

Stensrud was first elected to the House in 2010, unseating incumbent Rep. Maria Ruud by 107 votes. He served on the Commerce and Regulatory Reform, the Jobs and Economic Development Finance, and the State Government Finance committees.

During Stensrud's tenure in the House, he supported merit pay for high performing teachers, and was part of the creation of a controversial budget surplus which involved borrowing money from schools against future tobacco settlements.

Stensrud was defeated by Democrat Yvonne Selcer in the 2012 election, and again in the 2014 election.

Stensrud graduated from Bloomington Lincoln High School in Bloomington, then went on to Bethel University in Arden Hills, earning his B.A. in business. He and his family are active members of Wooddale Church in Eden Prairie.

References

External links 

 Rep. Stensrud Web Page
 Project Votesmart - Rep. Kirk Stensrud Profile
 Kirk Stensrud Campaign Web Site

1962 births
Living people
People from Bloomington, Minnesota
American evangelicals
Republican Party members of the Minnesota House of Representatives
People from Eden Prairie, Minnesota
21st-century American politicians